In Concert is a live album released by jazz pianist Dave Burrell. It was recorded at the Victoriaville Festival in Quebec, Canada and released that same year on October 21, 1991, by Victo Records. The album features Burrell's long-time jazz collaborator David Murray on reed instruments. According to the AllMusic review, "their influence is profound and wide-reaching" on this album.

Track listing 
"Punaluu Peter" (Burrell) — 12:42
"Hope Scope" (Murray) — 11:17
"Ballad for the Black Man" (Murray) — 10:34
"Intuitively" (Burrell) — 9:22
"Teardrops for Jimmy" (Burrell) — 7:14

Personnel 
Dave Burrell — piano
David Murray — tenor saxophone
Production:
François Bienvenue — graphic design
Sylvain Lafleur — photography
Jean-Pierre Loiselle — engineer
Music Producer for Société Radio-Canada: Daniel Vachon
Louise Trépanier — assistant engineer
Joanne Vézina — production assistant

Reception 

Allmusic (AMG) says that Murray can "solo gleefully" and his playing is "swinging like mad." Reviewer Thom Jurek says that the album "reveals two musicians at the very peak of their compositional, improvising, and listening skills." The Penguin Guide to Jazz notes that the album is a "perfect representation" of the "telepathic relationship" between Burrell and Murray something AMG also remarks on by calling "truly astonishing."

References

External links 
 

Dave Burrell albums
1991 live albums
David Murray (saxophonist) live albums
Collaborative albums